"I'd Be Lost" and "Only One" are two songs recorded by Australian singer-songwriter Sarah Blasko for her fifth studio album Eternal Return. Both songs premiered on 13 September 2015 during Richard Kingsmill's new music segment on Triple J and were released as a double A-side on 18 September 2015.

Music video
On 5 November 2015, the music videos for "I'd Be Lost" and "Only One" were uploaded to Blasko's VEVO channel. "I'd Be Lost" features the singer in front of a backdrop of incoming traffic, ending with her being engulfed in light. "Only One" follows Blasko as she makes her way alone through a carpark and starts dancing.

Track listing
 "I'd Be Lost" (Blasko, Fletcher, Hunt)
 "Only One" (Blasko, Wales)

External links
"I'd Be Lost" lyrics
"Only One" lyrics
"I'd Be Lost" music video
"Only One" music video

2015 songs
Sarah Blasko songs